The Mutual Ice Company Building in Westport, Kansas City, Missouri is a building from 1907. It was listed on the National Register of Historic Places in 2004.

See also
 List of ice companies

References

Buildings and structures in Kansas City, Missouri
Commercial buildings on the National Register of Historic Places in Missouri
Commercial buildings completed in 1907
Ice companies
National Register of Historic Places in Kansas City, Missouri